Robert A. Rasch Jr. is a United States Army lieutenant general who has served as the director of hypersonics, directed energy, space, and rapid acquisition of the Office of the Assistant Secretary of the Army for Acquisition, Logistics, and Technology since September 2, 2022. He was previously the program executive officer for missiles and space from July 2018 to August 2022.

Military career

In May 2022, Rasch was nominated for promotion to lieutenant general and assignment as director of hypersonics, directed energy, space and rapid acquisition of the Office of the Assistant Secretary of the Army (Acquisition, Logistics and Technology), succeeding L. Neil Thurgood.

References

External links
 

Living people
Place of birth missing (living people)
Recipients of the Legion of Merit
United States Army generals
United States Army personnel of the Gulf War
Year of birth missing (living people)